Arakalagudu Narasingarao Krishna Rao (9 May 1908 – 8 July 1971), popularly known as Anakru, was an Indian writer. He is one of the best-known writers in the Kannada-language and was popularly known as Kadambari Sarvabhouma (lit, "Universal monarch of Novels"). The inception of the Pragatishila ("progressive") movement in Kannada literature is credited to him. He received an honorary doctorate from the Mysore University and is also a recipient of the Karnataka Sahitya Academy Award.

Life
Anakru was born on 9 May 1908 in Kolar town of the erstwhile Kingdom of Mysore (in present-day Karnataka, India). to Narasinga Rao (father) and Annapoornamma (mother). The family traces its roots to Arkalgud town in the Hassan district of Karnataka. At the start of his career, he edited literary Kannada magazines such Katha Manjari and Vishva Vani. He was also an editor of the Kannada Sahitya Parishath's publication  Kannada Nudi ("Kannada speech"). Anakru was nominated as the president of 42nd Kannada Sahitya Sammelana held in Manipal. He is known for his passion for his native language Kannada. Once when introducing Anakru to an audience, Masti Venkatesh Iyengar, one of Kannada's most well-known writers said "I am a Tamil Kannadiga, Sir Mirza Ismail is a Muslim Kannadiga, and Anakru is a pure Kannadiga". This tribute from the likes of Masti mirrors the Kannada fervour Anakru was known for.

Anakru fought for the unification of Kannada speaking regions, when Kannada speakers were spread across different provinces in British India. He started a movement to promote and popularize Kannada. He openly criticized people in authority who neglected Kannada. In one such case, he wrote an article in the Kannada Nudi, criticizing the Hindi oriented policies of R. R. Divakar (the first governor of Bihar), the President of Kannada Sahitya Sammelana in 1929. On being asked to apologize, Anakru resigned from the post of the editor. Anakru lived most of his life in his house (called Annapoorna) in Vishveshwarapuram, a suburb in South Bangalore. He died on 8 July 1971 at the age of 63.

Literature
Starting with his first novel, Jeevanayathre ("Journey of life"), Anakru wrote for about 40 years and authored more than a hundred novels. He was a prolific writer and his literary output exceeded eighty thousand pages. When he started writing, the Navodaya form of Kannada literature was in vogue. He rejected this form because he felt such writings were a creation of aesthetes and did not reflect the disturbing realities of life. He came up with themes that formed a new movement in itself, called Pragatishila ("progressive"). Anakru saw literature as an instrument of social change. Influenced by Anakru, other promising writers such as Ta Ra Su (T.R. Subba Rao), Basavaraj Kattimani and Anupama Niranjana wrote novels that belonged to the Pragatishila genre.

Not known to follow the beaten track, Anakru penned three novels, Nagna Sathya, Shani Santaana and Sanje Gaththalu, with themes dwelling on the topic of prostitution for which he was criticized for depicting vulgarity in these novels. To defend his theme, Anakru wrote in his work Sahitya mattu kama prachodane ("Literature and the propagation of lust"): "If telling the truth is vulgar, then I am a vulgar writer. If the act of covering with a cloth, a downtrodden helpless naked woman on the street is vulgar, then I am a vulgar writer". His non-moralistic approach to writing and extensive usage of dialogue contributed to vast readership.

His magnum opus novel Natasarvabhowma runs for 750 pages, delves into the dire state of Kannada drama world, during the early 20th century. He provides the details about what was ailing the Kannada drama companies and provides valuable suggestions on their improvement. The novel covers the life of fictitious stage actor Rajacharaya, his struggle to establish as an actor and then to run the drama company as its proprietor. This novel was first published in 1940 and was way ahead of its time. The novel was criticized for celebrating the extramarital affairs of Rajacharya. However out of 750 pages hardly 3-4 pages covers this and the rest wonderfully depicts the do good nature of Rajachraya, where he donates majority of his earnings to charity. Krishna Raos love for the Kannada culture, its people and his quest to see the Kannada speaking areas integrated comes out clearly. He severely criticizes the language bigotry and tries to convey that all languages are great through Rajacharya.

Anakru wrote many novels where the protagonist was an artist. These novels follow a plot which narrates the story of a gifted musician who becomes famous, only to succumb to the charms of a woman. This leads to his subsequent failure as his commitment on the art deteriorates. At the end, the artist either overcomes this to regain his touch or succumbs completely to passion leading to his eventual failure. One of Anakru's most popular novels Sandhyaraaga belonged to this theme and narrates of the life of a dedicated musician while contrasting him with his mean brother.  a Kannada movie based on this novel in 1966 received critical acclaim. This same novel motivated Beechi, one of the great Kannada humorist, to contribute to Kannada literature. Other notable novels written by Anakru with on theme are the Mia Malhar, Udayaraga, Sahitya Ratna and Vijayanagara Samrajya (11 novels)

Awards and honours

President of the 43rd Kannada Sahitya Sammelana held in Manipal
Sahitya Akademi Karnataka State award. 
Honorary Doctorate in Literature from Mysore University

WritingsNovelKalankini
Amara August
Kamini Kanchana
Bannada Baduku
Hosilu Datida Hennu
Deva Priya
Rukmini
Shani Santhana
Sandhyaraaga
Kannadammanna Gudiyalli
Amrutha Manthana
Pankaja
Marjala Sanyasi
Kasthuri
Aashirwada
Anugraha
Bhoomigilidu Banda Bhagavanta
Enakshi
Chitrakale
Adrushta Nakshatra
Janatha Janardhana
Vishwa Bandhu Basavanna
Eedari Aadhari
Sangrama
Tayiya Karulu
Shubha Samaya
Yaariguntu Yaarigilla
Kabbinada Kaage
Natasarvabhowma
Nidumaamidi Sannidhiyavaru
Kannina Gombe
Maralu Mane
Samadarshana
Udayaraga
Nara Narayana
Punaravatara
Hengarulu
Deeparadhane
Sangrama Dhureena
Parivarthane
Bhuvana Mohini
Huliyuguru (Vol 1–3)
Gajina Mane
Narabali
Maneyalli Mahayuddha
Rana Vikrama
Sarthaka Sahitya
Sahitya Samaradhana
Kattida Banna
Kagadada Hoo
Muyyige Muyyee
Daadiya Maga
Akkayya
Abhayapradhana Mattu Tejobhanga
Nagna Sathya
Hennu Janma
Jeevanadhi
Abhimana
Sanje Gathalu
Sakidha Aliya
Kulaputra
Taayi Makkalu
Annadatha
Chitra Vichitra
Ratna Deepa
Kalavidha
Bhumi Tayi
Chiranjeeve
Stree Mukha Vyaghra
Hosa Suggi
Aparanji
Roopashree
Kanneeru
Bhagyadha Baagilu
Arulu Marulu
Honne Modhalu
Keerthi Kalasha
Hosa Huttu
Gruhalakshmi
Hegadharu Badhukona
Mudimallige
Barahagarana Baduku
Kunkuma Prasada
Dharmapathni
Garuda Machee
Vijaya Vidyaranya Mattu Thapobala [Vijayanagara seris - Harihara, bukka, Harihara II]
Punya Prabhava Mattu Prouda Prathapi [Vijayanagara Seris - Devaraya - I, Devaraya - II]
Mohana Murari Mattu Yashodundhubhi [Vijayanagara Seris - Saluva Narasimha , Sri Krishnadevaraya ]
Abhaya Pradhana Mattu Tejobhanga [Vijayanagara Seris - Sri Krishnadevaraya , Sri Achyutadevaraya ] 
Aaliya Ramaraya Mattu Pralayananthara [Vijayanagara Seris - Viajyanagara downfall, Araveedu Dynasty]
Veerashiva Sahithya Mattu Samskruthi
Aparajethe
Bhamamani
Miya Malhar
Panjarada Gini
Jathaka Pakshi
Papiya Nele
Gowri
Sumuhurtha
Jeevana Yatre
Srimathi
Natasarvabhowma
Kanchana Ganga
Anna Thangi
KaalachakaraPlayA Na Krishnarayara Pouranika Natakagalu
A Na Krishnarayara Samajika Natakagalu
A Na Krishnarayara Ithihasika NatakagaluCriticismKannada Kularasikaru
Sahitya Ratna
Bharateeya Kala Darshana
Sajeeva Sahitya
Nataka Kale
Sahitya Mattu Kamaprachodane
Karnatakada Hitha Chinthane
Sahitya Mattu Jeevana
Bharateeya Samskruthi Darshana
Samskrutiya Vishvarupa
A Na Kru Avara Samagra Veerashaiva Sahitya
Bharateeya Chitrakaleyalli Raja Ravivarmana Sthana
Kannada Sahitya Mattu Samskruti
Sahitya Mattu YugadharmaBiography'''Bharathada BapuKarnatakadha KalavidharuKailasam
Deenabandhu Kabeera
Sri Basavannanavara Amritavani
Allamaprabhu
Kannada Kula RasikaruAutobiographyAmara Chetana
Barahagarana Baduku Mathu Nannannu Naane KandeChildren's booksShree Krishnadevaraya : Kannada Nadu Mattu Kannadegara Parpampare
Kempegowda - Kannada Nadu Mattu Kannadigara Parampare
Sarvagna Kavi - Kannada Nadu Mattu Kannadigara Parampare
Yalahanka Bhupaala
Sundharu SamsaraReligion & OtherBhagavadgeetaarthasaaraShort Story'Neelalochane Mattu Ithara KathegaluA Na Kru Avara Samagra Katha Sankalana''

Notes

References

1908 births
1971 deaths
Kannada people
Kannada-language writers
People from Kolar